Harlem Blues is an album by American jazz pianist Phineas Newborn Jr. recorded in 1969 but not released on the Contemporary label until 1975. The album was recorded at the same sessions that produced Please Send Me Someone to Love.

Reception
The Allmusic review by Scott Yanow states "The superb trio (pianist Phineas Newborn, bassist Ray Brown and drummer Elvin Jones) had never played together before but it didn't matter. They had little trouble finding common ground. The virtuosic pianist (still in peak form) leads the way".

Track listing
 "Harlem Blues" (Phineas Newborn Jr.) – 4:12 		
 "Sweet and Lovely" (Gus Arnheim, Jules LeMare, Harry Tobias) – 7:38
 "Little Girl Blue" (Lorenz Hart, Richard Rodgers) – 6:14
 "Ray's Idea" (Ray Brown, Gil Fuller) – 5:21
 "Stella by Starlight" (Ned Washington, Victor Young) – 6:02
 "Tenderly" (Walter Gross, Jack Lawrence) – 5:55
 "Cookin' at the Continental" (Horace Silver) – 3:07

Personnel
Phineas Newborn Jr. – piano
Ray Brown – bass
Elvin Jones – drums

References

Contemporary Records albums
Phineas Newborn Jr. albums
1975 albums